Beyond the Black Rainbow is a 2010 Canadian science fiction horror film written and directed by Panos Cosmatos in his feature film debut. It stars Michael Rogers and Eva Allan.

Beyond the Black Rainbow was distributed by Mongrel Media in Canada, and by Magnet Releasing, a sub-division of Magnolia Pictures, in the United States. Produced and filmed in Vancouver, the film premiered at the 2010 Whistler Film Festival, in Whistler, British Columbia. Through 2011, it was also screened at several film festivals across North America, including Tribeca Film Festival in New York City, Fantastic Fest in Austin, Texas and Fantasia Festival in Montreal.

Plot

In the 1960s, Mercurio Arboria founded the Arboria Institute, a New Age research facility dedicated to finding a reconciliation between science and spirituality, allowing humans to move into a new age of "Serenity Through Technology" and perpetual happiness. Now, in 1983, Arboria's work has long since been taken over by his protégé, Dr. Barry Nyle. Outwardly a charming, handsome scientist, Nyle is a psychopath who has been keeping Elena, a young girl, captive deep within the lower levels of the institute. Because there is no sunlight or sense of time in this place, the facility operates in "Day Mode" and "Night Mode." Elena only communicates through telepathy and demonstrates psychic capabilities, which Nyle suppresses using a glowing, prismatic device located somewhere in the bowels of the institute, from where it emanates a deep, droning hum.

In an effort to understand Elena's abilities, Nyle subjects her to daily "therapy" sessions, during which Elena begs to see her father, but Nyle tells her she is very ill, and "not ready" for the world. By night, Elena is kept in her room, where she uses her psychic abilities to surreptitiously watch television shows through a video monitor in the wall. Nyle spends his nights at home with his wife Rosemary, a docile woman who appears to exist in a state of marijuana-induced stupor, yet seems to genuinely care for Nyle despite his lack of tenderness towards her. Nyle takes significant quantities of prescription medication, smiling at his insane reflection in the bathroom mirror.

Attempting to elicit an emotional response from Elena, Nyle speaks about her dead mother, whom he calls "beautiful" and "desirable". He hints that a photo of her might be in Elena's room, which she later discovers under her bed.

That evening, Elena's nurse Margo discovers Nyle's case notes regarding Elena in a hidden recess in the wall, finding strange symbols and images that indicate Nyle's violent sexual obsession with Elena. Fearful of what the notes contain, Margo puts them back. Afterward, Nyle receives a mysterious phone call and rushes back to the Institute where he discovers ash from Margo's cigarette near the case notes. Nyle takes a psychedelic drug to calm himself.

Suspicious of Margo, Nyle informs her that Elena has smuggled contraband into her room. Margo later harasses and verbally abuses Elena, destroying the photo, and Nyle deactivates the suppressor device. Elena kills her by telekinetically causing her brain to burst through her eyes. Nyle, having monitored these events, is intrigued by this blatant display of psychic ability and pleased at Margo's death. He allows Elena to leave her cell and reactivates the prism, causing her to convulse and fall to the floor. Nyle then releases an anaesthetic gas into the facility. As Elena lies unconscious, Nyle electronically summons an entity in a helmeted red environment suit (identified as a "Sentionaut"), who injects a tracking device in Elena's neck before carrying her back to bed and removing all traces of Margo's brutalized corpse.

Nyle goes to see Arboria in another area of the institute. Displaying signs of senility and drug addiction, Arboria does not acknowledge Nyle's psychosis, regarding him as his best protégé. A flashback to 1966 reveals that Elena's mother was Arboria's wife Anna, who was present when Arboria led a young Nyle through a procedure meant to allow him to achieve transcendence. As a part of the procedure, Nyle was submerged in a vat of black liquid and experienced otherworldly, hellish visions. Nyle emerged insane and killed Anna. Unperturbed, Arboria submerged the infant Elena in the black liquid. Back in the "present" of 1983, Nyle murders Arboria by administering a fatal drug overdose, which Elena experiences via telepathic link with her father.

Nyle returns home, while a television broadcasts an address from President Reagan. He reveals that he disguises his complete lack of hair and his black irises with an elaborate wig and contact lenses. Presenting himself to his wife without these appliances, and dressed in a strange black outfit, he declares his primacy as an evolved being from "Beyond the Black Rainbow," and pushes his thumbs into Rosemary's eye sockets, killing her.

Meanwhile, Elena escapes, having used her psychic powers to render herself undetectable to the prism. She rides an elevator, evades a Sentionaut, and traverses a deep ventilation shaft on her journey upward through the Arboria Institute. Along the way, she encounters and narrowly avoids a bound, monstrous humanoid as her defense against the suppressor briefly fails. As she arrives at an upper level, she is confronted by another Sentionaut, whom she influences with her telepathy, prompting it to remove the visor on its helmet to reveal a mutated, childlike face. Arriving in a staff lounge, Elena finds that no other people seem to be working at the institute. Walking through the Arboria Institute's "award-winning gardens," she at last arrives outside the walls and sees the night sky for the first time in her life.

Nyle, having at last shed the pretense of humanity, dissolved his final contact to the material world, and wielding a ceremonial dagger he calls "The Devil's Tear-Drop," arrives back at the institute to find Elena gone. He produces a transponder receiver and departs. While pursuing Elena through the wooded areas surrounding the institute, he encounters a pair of "heshers," whom he kills after insisting one of them had sex with Elena.

Having located her using the tracking implant, Nyle eventually corners Elena in a clearing and repeatedly implores her to come to him. Elena uses her psychic abilities to keep Nyle's feet planted on the ground and as he tries to approach her, Nyle falls, hits his head against a rock, and dies instantly. Free of her captor, Elena finds herself on a suburban street, guided by the light generated by a television set.

A post-credits scene reveals a Sentionaut action figure, ostensibly in a child's bedroom.

Cast

Production

Development

As a child, Cosmatos frequented a video store named Video Attic. During these trips he would browse the horror film section looking at the boxes although he was not allowed to watch such films. During such times he would instead imagine what the film was. He would later reflect upon this experience when making Black Rainbow where one of his goals was "to create a film that is a sort of imagining of an old film that doesn't exist." The year 1983 was chosen for the story as it's the first year he went to Video Attic. Additionally he thought the idea of setting such a film one year before 1984 was funny. The film's genesis was an overlap between two projects Cosmatos wanted to do. One of these was a film about a girl trapped in an asylum while the other was an installation promoting a research facility that didn't exist. Eventually Cosmatos realized that he could use both ideas in the same project.

The presence of his parents haunts "every frame of this film", said the Rome-born filmmaker. His father was film director George P. Cosmatos (whose credits include Rambo: First Blood Part II and Cobra), deceased in April 2005, and his mother Swedish sculptor Birgitta Ljungberg-Cosmatos, who died in July 1997 after a lengthy battle with cancer. Unable to deal with his mother's death, Panos "drifted into a slow motion mode of self-destruction and binge drinking." When elder Cosmatos died, the grief he felt compounded. After that the aspiring writer/director started therapy and decided he wanted to make a film as part of the healing process. Cosmatos felt that his "filmmaking sensibility is a weird hybrid of both of them" – his father's "popcorn movies" and his mother's haunting, experimental art.

Casting
Eva Allan, who plays the main female lead, found an acting agent right away after graduating from School Creative which led to her role on this film.

Filming
Beyond the Black Rainbow was financed by DVD residuals from Tombstone (1993), directed by Panos' father. The film was shot in three weeks using a modified Panavision 35 mm camera. This was suggested by cinematographer Norm Li, for he noted that Panos' references – mostly films from the '70s and '80s – "were all grainy, colorful, and full of texture", and he felt the 35 mm format was "the only way to shoot."

Style and influences

Visuals
Beyond the Black Rainbow has been praised for its visual style. Cosmatos declared that his "modernist" use of color was influenced by Michael Mann's Manhunter (1986) and The Keep (1983). The blue hue cinematography – the "night mode" as Cosmatos dubbed it – was inspired by the freezer room scene in John Carpenter's Dark Star (1974). Norm Li cited other references: Daft Punk's Electroma (2006), Dario Argento's Suspiria (1977), and George Lucas' THX 1138 (1971). A number of reviewers noted similarities between the film and Stanley Kubrick's 2001: A Space Odyssey (1968) and A Clockwork Orange (1971). "I love Stanley Kubrick, and have seen, and probably internalized, all of his work, but any similarity was not my intent", explained Cosmatos. Critics have also compared Beyond the Black Rainbow to Andrei Tarkovsky's Solaris (1972), Ken Russell's Altered States (1980), and Gaspar Noé's Enter the Void (2010). Of the latter, the director deemed it "a very interesting, very beautiful film."

The 1966 flashback segment of the movie was inspired by E. Elias Merhige's experimental horror film Begotten (1990). Begotten was entirely shot in high-contrast black-and-white, which for Cosmatos "was a perfect look for the flashback because I wanted it to feel like a fading and decayed artifact." The young Barry Nyle's acid trip in that segment of Beyond the Black Rainbow was inspired by the "Battle of the Gods" sequence in Jean-Luc Godard's Contempt (1963).

Cosmatos also takes influence from other visual media. The director declared his love for Heavy Metal magazine and the work of French comics artist Jean "Moebius" Giraud. Fantasy art was also an influence, especially Frank Frazetta's paintings. Norm Li stated that both he and the director "also looked at abstract paintings, photographs, and architectural design books" for inspiration.

Pacing
One of Beyond the Black Rainbow'''s notable characteristics is its deliberately slow, hypnotic pace. According to Cosmatos, Beyond the Black Rainbow belongs to what he dubbed the "trance film" subgenre. Cosmatos mentioned Francis Ford Coppola's Apocalypse Now (1979), Alain Resnais' Last Year at Marienbad (1961) and Saul Bass's Phase IV (1974) as cinematographic blueprints for his debut film. Cosmatos explained the rationale behind his screen-writing, which downplays the "very concrete story at the heart of it" in favor of an "atmospheric" approach:

Music
Jeremy Schmidt, keyboard player for Vancouver-based rockers Black Mountain, was invited by Cosmatos to compose the film's soundtrack. "Evil Ball", a track from Schmidt's solo project, Sinoia Caves, was used by the movie's director on a private screening held for Schmidt. A mutual appreciation for Tangerine Dream, John Carpenter soundtracks and Giorgio Moroder's music for Midnight Express (1978) and American Gigolo (1980) cemented their bond. Schmidt also pointed out the background music from The Shining (1980) and Risky Business (1983) as musical blueprints for the Beyond the Black Rainbow score.

Regarding the impact of The Shinings soundtrack on his score, Schmidt singled out the compositions by György Ligeti and Krzysztof Penderecki as sonic touchstones. Their music had already been featured in the sci-fi and horror genres, two of Cosmatos's main cinematic obsessions when young. Ligeti pieces "Lux Aeterna" and "Atmosphères" had been featured in 2001: A Space Odyssey, and Penderecki's "Polymorphia" and a portion of "The Devils of Loudun" was used in The Exorcist (1973).

For his analogue synthesizer score, Schmidt used the following equipment: a Prophet 5, two Oberheims, Moog Taurus bass pedals, a Korg CX-3 organ and a Mellotron. An extensive use of the Mellotron can be heard on the flashback sequence, where Cosmatos had been using Pink Floyd's "Set the Controls for the Heart of the Sun" as a temp track. All in all, "the chosen palette of sounds definitely harkens back to 'The New Age of Enlightenment'", said Schmidt. 
The music was mixed by Joshua Stevenson at Otic Sound, Vancouver, British Columbia, Canada.

Themes

Control
Director Cosmatos stated that he's interested in social control mechanisms, our own personal, internal controls and how religion affects our consciousness and society. These philosophical ideas are present in Beyond the Black Rainbow, a film focused on issues of repression and control of emotions. Cosmatos partly picked up these themes by reading the science fiction works of Beat novelist William S. Burroughs, books by and large dealing with societal control.

According to Cosmatos, the "rigid geometric world" of the Arboria Institute visually fits the movie's control theme. This is especially true for the Dr. Nyle character, someone "very knowledged, trying to create a very controlled environment to give himself a feeling of power." The light triangle, responsible for dampening Elena's psychic powers, is another control symbol. The institute's plethora of reflecting surfaces – the walls in the hallways, the giant piece of glass in the therapy room, the infinity-mirrored Sentionaut room, Margo's glasses – might somewhat hint at this idea. To many ancient cultures, the mirror was a symbol of self-awareness, consciousness and intelligence, but also a source of pride and vanity.Lurker, Manfred. (2003). Dicionário de simbologia. São Paulo: Martins Fontes. The visual reference for Arboria Institute's interior design was THX 1138.

The film's control leitmotif is shown in a subtler way by reflecting North America's political climate in the 1980s. Beyond the Black Rainbow has been called a "Reagan-era fever dream". Its paranoid, Cold War mood contains nods to the late U.S. president – through a clip of an ominous televised speech by Ronald Reagan himself – and former Panamenian general and convicted drug lord Manuel Noriega (Dr. Nyle's "Noriega" jacket). The Central American dictator had direct involvement in the "Iran-Contra" scandal. Noriega's fight against the Sandinistas, Nicaragua's left-wing guerrillas, was backed up by the CIA and the Pentagon. The CIA funded Noriega's military campaign with profits from the illegal sale of arms to Iran. The CIA also turned a blind eye to Noriega's drug trafficking.

Identity
Another of Beyond the Black Rainbow‘s main themes is identity. Over the course of the movie Dr. Nyle experiences a radical change of personality whose roots lie in the terrifying drug experience he had in 1966, under Mercurio Arboria's supervision. Being exposed to his shadow side so intensely crippled not only his mind, but his body: Barry is forced to use appliances such as a wig and contact lenses. Similar to many Lovecraftian protagonists, Barry Nyle is ultimately a pathetic character: his far-reaching knowledge, restrained demeanor and carefully controlled work environment are unable to dominate the forces of irrationality and chaos burning in his mind. In the end, the doctor undergoes a physical and psychological transformation where he forfeits all control and gives in to madness.

 Criticism of "Baby Boomers" of the 1960s and the conservative backlash of the 1980s 

Cosmatos admits a dislike for Baby Boomers' spiritual ideals, an issue he addresses in Beyond the Black Rainbow. For him, the Boomers' search for alternative belief systems made them dabble in the dark side of occultism, which in turn corrupted their quest for spiritual enlightenment. The use of psychedelic drugs for mind-expansion purposes is also explored, although Cosmatos' take on it is "dark and disturbing", a "brand of psychedelia that stands in direct opposition to the flower child, magic mushroom peace trip" wrote a reviewer. UGO Networks's Jordan Hoffman noted both elements, stating in his review that in the movie some "up-to-no-good new age scientists have let their experiments with consciousness-altering drugs mutate a young woman" – in this case, Elena. Cosmatos explains why Dr. Arboria's mission to create a superior human ultimately failed:

German film critic Hauke Lehmann, C. H. Newell writing at Father Son Holy Gore, and Mike Lesuer of Flood Magazine summarize Cosmatos's message with both Beyond the Black Rainbow and his next film Mandy as that the progressive social, political, and cultural utopias of the 1960s (as represented by Dr. Arboria and his original plans with his institute) went wrong because they weren't prepared yet for what lay beyond Aldous Huxley and Timothy Leary's doors of perception, thus inviting the considerably worse counter-movement in the form of the conservative, right-wing 1980s (represented by Barry). Likewise, Simon Abrams and Steven Boone of Hollywood Reporter also note Cosmatos's harsh criticisms of the American conservative right of the 1980s. For this reason Lehmann, in his aforementioned Cinema essay, calls Beyond the Black Rainbow an "even more advanced version" of the social and political themes found in Easy Rider and Fear and Loathing in Las Vegas.

Reception
Cosmatos noted that critical reception of the film was originally "kind of muted, even downright negative" at first, but it began picking up better reviews after Tribeca 2011.

The film has an approval rating of 61% on Rotten Tomatoes based on 36 reviews and an average score of 6.30/10.  Negative reviews focused generally on the surreal inscrutability of the plot and accusations of shallow pastiche; Tony Norman of the Pittsburgh Post-Gazette called it "all ambiance and no substance", and Joe Neumaier of The New York Daily News called it a boring failure.  Mark Feeney of The Boston Globe cited the atmosphere "that's impressively sustained – until it becomes oppressive, then pointless, then laughable,"  with the concept better suited to a short film.  Some mixed reviews, like William Goss of MSN, praised the film's surreal atmosphere and synth score, despite finding it "not my cup of crazy", while Marjorie Baumgarten of the Austin Chronicle cited the movie as inexplicable and incomprehensible, though praising the visuals. Jeannette Catsoulis of The New York Times also gave a mixed review, highlighting the appeal to fans of midnight movies.  Lou Lumenick of The New York Post called it "the movie equivalent of gazing at a lava lamp for nearly two hours."

Positive reviews highlighted the cult appeal, such as Matt Singer of Time Out, who welcomed the return of challenging, surreal midnight movies.  Alison Willmore of The A.V. Club rated it B+, praising its style and daring form.  Don R. Lewis of Film Threat also praised the film, saying, "As a cinema fan I was blown away at the control and attention to detail Cosmatos showed."

During the second half of the 2010s, however, Beyond the Black Rainbow has undergone a critical reappraisal. While the film originally started out with a score of 49% on Rotten Tomatoes in 2012 and 2013, it progressively climbed to 61% on the Tomatometer, especially after the wider, more prominent release of Cosmatos's second film Mandy in 2018. Writing for Inverse in 2017, pop culture critic Isaac Feldberg praised Beyond the Black Rainbow as an examination of Cosmatos' own nostalgia for the sci-fi and horror movies of his youth; "Cosmatos imagines an alternate ‘80s in which their aesthetics can be so completely expressed they assume physical form, seeping through the Arboria Institute like a fog of cultural memory," he wrote.  The film has garnered spots on various best-of lists of professional reviewers – #27 on The Playlist's 2016 The 50 Best Sci-Fi Films Of The 21st Century So Far, #20 on The Film Stage's 2016 The 50 Best Sci-Fi Films of the 21st Century Thus Far, #19 on Fandor's 2016 Best Science Fiction of the Century (so far), and #1 on Taste of Cinema's 2017 10 totally awesome Sci-Fi movies from the 2010s (so far).

In a 2016 interview with The Hollywood Reporter about their smash hit Netflix series, Matt Duffer expressed surprise at allegations that Stranger Things was a direct homage to Beyond The Black Rainbow'', which he claimed to have never seen before, while Ross Duffer admitted to having seen "a little" of it.

References

External links
 
 
 

2010 films
2010s science fiction horror films
English-language Canadian films
Films set in 1983
Films set in 1966
Films shot in Vancouver
Films set in the 1980s
Films set in the 1960s
Canadian science fiction horror films
Films directed by Panos Cosmatos
2010 directorial debut films
Surrealist films
Period horror films
2010s English-language films
2010s Canadian films